The following lists events that happened during 1928 in South Africa.

Incumbents
 Monarch: King George V.
 Governor-General and High Commissioner for Southern Africa: The Earl of Athlone.
 Prime Minister: James Barry Munnik Hertzog.
 Chief Justice: William Henry Solomon.

Events
May

 31 – South Africa adopts a new national flag, based upon the Van Riebeeck flag or Prinsevlag (originally the Dutch flag), to replace the Red Ensign.

June
 9 – Ellis Park Stadium officially opens in Johannesburg.

Unknown date
 Eskom's first thermal power station, Salt River No. 1, begins operation.
 The Cecchetti Society of Southern Africa is formed with the aim of promoting the Methods of Enrico Cecchetti and introducing the Principles of the Cecchetti method to young ballet dancers in Southern Africa.

Births
 2 January – Kate Molale, anti-apartheid activist. (d. 1980)
 16 January – Dirk Mudge, Namibian politician (d. 2020)
 19 March – Clive van Ryneveld, cricketer (d. 2018)
 27 May – Johan Heyns, theologian. (d. 1994)
 10 July – Jack Nel, cricketer (d. 2018)
 27 August – Mangosuthu Buthelezi, leader of the Inkatha Freedom Party.
 1 October – Laurence Harvey, Lithuanian-born South African actor. (d. 1973)
 14 November – George Bizos, human rights lawyer.

Deaths
 5 June – Liege Hulett, politician and sugar magnate. (b. 1838)

Railways

Railway lines opened
 31 January – Cape – Winter's Rush to Koopmansfontein, .
 24 February – Transvaal – Klerksdorp to Ottosdal, .
 14 April – Transvaal – Potchefstroom to Fochville, .
 1 May – Cape – George to Knysna, .
 11 June – Transvaal – Brits to Beestekraal, .
 2 July – Transvaal – Singlewood to Zebediela, .
 9 July – South West Africa – Ondekaremba to Seeis, .
 18 July – Free State – Bothaville to Wesselsbron, .

Locomotives
Three new Cape gauge steam locomotive types enter service on the South African Railways (SAR):
 The first six Class 16DA 4-6-2 Pacific type passenger locomotives.
 Four Class 19  Mountain type branch line steam locomotives.
 Two Class GH 4-6-2+2-6-4 Double Pacific type passenger versions of the Class U Union Garratt articulated steam locomotive.

References

History of South Africa